The Central District of Hendijan County is a district (bakhsh) in Hendijan County, Khuzestan Province, Iran. At the 2006 census, its population was 28,715, in 5,803 families.  The district has one city: Hendijan.  The district has two rural districts (dehestan): Hendijan-e Gharbi Rural District and Hendijan-e Sharqi Rural District.

References 

Hendijan County
Districts of Khuzestan Province